Bozorgmehr Hosseinpour (born in 1976) is an Iranian cartoonist, comic artist, and art director. He holds a bachelor of painting from the Azad University of Tehran (1378).

Early life
Bozorgmehr Hosseinpour got introduced to the magical world of paint and brush, through his father's art pieces. As a kid he was always surrounded by his father's art works, which made his childhood memories so colorful and the house itself into a museum filled with tableaus and statues etc. 
As he grew up, Bozorgmehr was receiving education in calligraphy, painting, drawing as well as miniatures. However, it was only in elementary school when he started creating caricatures of his school bus driver on the way home, not exactly knowing that he was creating pieces called, caricature. 
After a while he started finding his own path using his magnificent and critical mind. At the age of 12 he published an inner family comic book. A year later, after his work got published by a magazine, he got hired by Kumarth Saberi the editor of Gol Agha, which was a prestigious and well known magazine at a time.
He has been influenced and fascinated by the works of Gauguin, Vincent van Gogh and other impressionists which led to studying painting at the Azad University of Tehran in 1994.
Throughout his cooperation with Kambiz Derambakhsh, and Ahmad Arabani his Artistic character got evolved.

Bozorgmehr Hosseinpour is the Editor in Chief of the chizna online news website, at the present time.

Animation and movie

Directed and created more than 10 promotional/commercial teasers for Iranian brands.
Directed and created 50 minutes of short films ordered by Saba Co.
Directed and created 50 minutes of animated short films ordered by Saba Co. 
Directed and created a short animated film named “khoob, bad, eshgh”.
Directed and created animated films ordered by" Hozeye Honari Institute”.
Created story boards of the movie “Shabanerooz” directed by Omid Bonakdar and keivan alimohamadi.
Created story boards of the movie”Wooden Bridge” directed by Mahdi Karampour.
Attendance and cooperation at directing board meetings of ”Khandevaneh” series.

Press

Editor in chief of "Chelcheragh" weekly magazine
Editor of comic strip department and caricaturist of "Irandokht" weekly magazine
Editor of design and the designer of comic strip for “Peike Sabz” weekly magazine
Editor of design and caricaturist of “Mehrnameh” monthly magazine
Caricaturist of “Jadid” monthly magazine
Art director of “Zanane Farda” magazine
Art director of “Aroose Honar” magazine
Cooperation with the following press: keihan caricature, zan newspaper, yase no newspaper, eghbal newspaper, etemade melli newspaper, aftabgardan newspaper, soroush nojavan magazine, roshde javan magazine, seda weekly magazine, mardome emrooz newspaper

Books

“Dolmeh series” Gol agha publications,(1999)
“The Sandwich” Aftabgardaan publications,(2004)
“Gher o ghambil series” Rozaneh publications, 2005, 
“Someone is here alone” Rozaneh publications, 2008, 
“These … politicians” Rozaneh publications, 2010, 
“I am a Calf” Mosallas publications, 2011, 
“The helter-skelter City” Mosallas publications, 2015, 
“Metro series”

Virtual activities (The Web)

“The Ma’moolis” a collection of comic strips with social perspective
Editor in chief of online news and caricature website named www.chizna.ir

Solo exhibitions

“A Cartoonist” Silk Road gallery, Tehran, (2013)
“Women of Qajar dynasty” Silk Road gallery, Tehran, (2013)
“The Harem of Qajar dynasty” Galerie Nicolas Flamel, Paris, (August 2014)
“Persian Gardens” Galerie Nicolas Flamel, Paris, (March 2015)
“Against Terrorism” Centre Culturel Zoroastrien de Paris & Laboratoire Aerodynamique Eiffel, Paris, (2015)
“Being a 2 years old, being a calf” caricature, Silk Road gallery 2, Tehran, (April 2015)
″A Cartoonist in naser aldin shah's harem 3″ silk road gallery, Tehran, (December 2017)

Group exhibitions

“Takhti” Shirin gallery, 2014
“Iran” Nicolas flam ell gallery, November 2015
“Khayyam and modern Art” Silk Road gallery, December 2015

Performances

“Seventy-tow nationalities” more than 2000 people attended this performance in order to be painted by Bozorgmehr Hosseinpour. And only 470 of them were painted within 5 hours. Silk Road gallery, Tehran, 
“Tehran”, Tehran, February 2015
“Peace” piece of art created by people. Every individual drew a line (registered under their name) in order to complete the painting. In the end 1395 lines were drawn in a week.
″Nails″ In 2016, a performance by Bozorgmehr took place in Tehran in order to raise awareness against domestic child abuse and violence. Nearly a thousand people showed up. They were all asked to bring a nail with them. Bozorgmehr used all the nails to draw that painting. The painting showed that a father's hand was being kept away from his child's face by all of those nails in a way that he couldn't slap the kid. The painting was sold and all the benefits went for charity.
In December 2016 Bozorgmehr Hosseinpour drew a painting during Shahram Nazeri and Kamkars concert, live on the scene. this painting was sold in order to help the charities and NGOs which were helping the survivors of Iran's 2016 earthquake at the time. All the benefits went to the Iran's 2016 earthquake survivors.

Awards

Winner of national cartoon exhibition of council of Tehran in subject of : *“The Blue sky of Tehran”.
1996-1st prize of the urban press exhibition.
2003-3rd prize of “Dialogue of civilizations international cartoon exhibition,Iran”.
2006-2nd prize of the urban press exhibition.
2006-The best animated short film in the urban satirical exhibition.
2007-Golden medal of Persian cartoon special site as the best cartoonist of the year.
2007-Selected prize of The great visual art festival of China.
2007-1st prize of international cartoon biennial of Tehran in the portrait section.

References

1976 births
Iranian cartoonists
Living people
Iranian film directors
Islamic Azad University alumni